Robert Cadman or Robert Kidman (1711–2 February 1739) was an 18th-century steeplejack and ropeslider who between 1732 and 1739 performed feats of daring, ultimately by sliding or flying down a rope from St Mary's Church, Shrewsbury to the Gay Meadow across the River Severn. 

He had previously performed the stunt in other locations, for example an 1828 history of Dover (Batcheller) records that he "amused the people of Dover, by flying across the harbour, from the highest point of the cliff, towards the lower extremity of Snargate-street .....Thousands were assembled from all parts to view this novel sight." A History of Lincoln (1815) notes that, in this period, he went from a cathedral tower "to the castle hill near the Black Boy Inn"" and another descent from 'Newark spire' in Nottinghamshire.

Cadman walked some 250 metres up the rope that connected the 68-metre-high spire of St Mary's Church with an anchor in the ground in Gay Meadow, Shrewsbury. Climbing up the rope across the River Severn, he performed tricks on the way. When at the top, near the pinnacle of the spire, he donned a wooden breastplate with a central groove and hurtled to earth along the rope.

On 2 February 1739 he fell to his death when the rope broke. He was buried at St Mary's Church, where a commemorative plaque in his memory may still be found by the west entrance. It reads:

References

1711 births
1739 deaths
Accidental deaths from falls
Accidental deaths in England
British entertainers
Steeplejacks